The Bystander was a British weekly tabloid magazine that featured reviews, topical drawings, cartoons and short stories. Published from Fleet Street, it was established in 1903 by George Holt Thomas.  Its first editor, William Comyns Beaumont, later edited the magazine again from 1928 to 1932.

It was notably popular during World War I for its publication of the "Old Bill" cartoons by Bruce Bairnsfather.   The magazine also employed many notable artists including H. M. Bateman, W. Heath Robinson, Howard Elcock, Helen McKie, Arthur Watts, Will Owen, Edmund Blampied and L. R. Brightwell.

It also published some of the earliest stories of Daphne du Maurier (Beaumont's niece), as well as short stories by Saki, including "Filboid Studge, the Story of a Mouse that Helped".

The magazine ran until 1940, when it merged with The Tatler (titled Tatler & Bystander until 1968).

References

Notes
Mr. Comyns Beaumont, Obituaries, The Times, January 2, 1956
Mr. Comyns Beaumont, Mr. Richard Viner, The Times, January 13, 1956

1903 establishments in the United Kingdom
1940 disestablishments in the United Kingdom
Defunct literary magazines published in the United Kingdom
Magazines established in 1903
Magazines disestablished in 1940
Magazines published in London
Weekly magazines published in the United Kingdom